King Kong Lives (released as King Kong 2 in some countries) is a 1986 American monster adventure film directed by John Guillermin. Produced by De Laurentiis Entertainment Group and featuring special effects by Carlo Rambaldi, the film stars Linda Hamilton and Brian Kerwin. The film is a sequel to the 1976 remake of King Kong. This was the final Kong film in which the eponymous character was portrayed using suits and practical effects; further films would utilize computer animation.

Plot
After being shot down from the World Trade Center, Kong is revealed to have been revived from his death, and has been kept in a coma for about 10 years at the Atlantic Institute, under the care of surgeon Dr. Amy Franklin. In order to save Kong's life, Dr. Franklin must perform a heart transplant and give Kong a computer-monitored artificial heart. However, he has lost so much blood that a transfusion is badly needed, and to complicate matters, Franklin says there is no species of ape or other animal whose blood type matches Kong's.

Enter Hank "Mitch" Mitchell, adventurer and Franklin's eventual love interest, who travels to Borneo (as he theorizes that Borneo and the island from the first film were once part of the same landmass) and captures a giant female ape who is dubbed "Lady Kong". Mitchell brings her to the institute to use her blood for King Kong's operation. The transfusion and the heart transplant are a success, but Kong escapes along with Lady Kong.

Archie Nevitt, an insane army lieutenant colonel, is called in with his men to hunt down and kill the two apes. Lady Kong is captured alive by Nevitt's troops and imprisoned; Kong falls from a cliff and is presumed dead. However, as Franklin and Mitchell soon discover, Kong's artificial heart is beginning to give out, forcing them to attempt a jailbreak. They discover that Lady Kong is pregnant with Kong's offspring. The jailbreak is successful thanks to Kong, who has survived the fall and breaks his mate out. After being followed, attacked, and shot by the military, Kong kills Lt. Col Nevitt and dies slowly near a military base on a farm where Lady Kong gives birth to an infant son. Kong reaches out to touch his son just before dying. Having returned to Borneo, Lady Kong lives peacefully with her son in the jungle.

Cast

Production
De Laurentiis had been interested in making a sequel to King Kong since he made the remake. In 1977, he said there would "definitely" be a sequel. "Steve McQueen made a picture in which he died at the end, but they made another picture with Steve McQueen. Many stars die at the end of a picture and then go on to the next picture. Kong is a star. We are going to have a new story, a new Kong."

Progress of a sequel was complicated by the fact the 1976 film was considered a financial disappointment and there were ongoing legal uncertainties over who owned the rights to King Kong.

A number of scripts had been written. ""They had King Kong in Russia and King Kong In outer space," said writer Steve Pressfield. "Really, this is not an exaggeration. They even had one with little kids leading him around, saying things like 'Careful, Kong, don't step on that car.' It really was an embarrassment." 
 
Pressfield and Ron Schusett pitched the idea that Kong has been on a giant respirator for years, and he was brought back to life with an artificial heart. According to Pressfield, "Dino loved the whole idea of the artificial heart and said, 'That's brilliant. I've been wondering for five years how to bring him back to life in a way that people would accept.' Sure, it's campy, but It's outrageous enough that it really works."

John Guillermin had been hoping to direct a version of Tai Pan with Sean Connery but when that project was unable to be financed, he moved on to King Kong Lives! The writers met with Guillermin and together devised the story about Kong getting an infusion from a female ape.

"When we came up with the idea, Dino was very skeptical and didn't want to do it," said Pressfield. "It's hard enough to accept that there's a King Kong but since he has been around for 50 years he has become a pop cult hero. No one is going to believe a female ape.' I said, 'Dino, he had to have a mother,' And he said, 'By God, you're right, I never thought of that. There can be a female,' and we went with it."

The film was announced in October 1985. It was part of a slate of films from De Laurentiis in association with Embassy that also included Blue Velvet.

Pressfield said "The whole thing is a love story with the two apes, but there's also a lot of action and an uplifting ending, although there are some elements of tragedy, as there were in the original. We even give a nod to women's lib with Lady Kong falling for the male scientist. Of course, this is before she meets the King."

Guillermin said later that making a sequel to King Kong was a bad idea. "Dino was striking out on all sorts of things at the time. It's really too bad [that he suffered a run of flops]. He was involved with some interesting projects."

Brian Kerwin said, "I knew that my name would be up there as the lead, but there was never any question that the star of the movie was the ape. Also, the 1976 movie had such low prestige and Jessica Lange was ridiculed, but then so was Christopher Reeve for Superman, and look at the subsequent success of those two. So, I don't worry about it. We tried to have fun when we were making the movie, without poking fun at it. It's an adult fairy tale and it has humor. If people think it's a silly piece of fluff and we're all jerks, then that's the way it goes. I hope it doesn't happen."

Linda Hamilton said "I'm happy that I don't have to get picked up by the monkey and become the object of his desire. I save Kong. And it's nice to play someone who is not hysterical and dramatic and intense all the time."
 
Filming started in April 1986 in Tennessee. "The movie is about Kong, about special effects, about jeeps being blown up," says John Ashton.

Release

Home media

King Kong Lives was released on VHS in 1987 by Lorimar Home Video and on DVD in 2004 by 20th Century Fox.

Reception

Box office
Despite its marketing campaign, King Kong Lives was a box office flop in the United States and Canada, grossing $4,711,220 during its theatrical run.

According to one account, "Besides the fact that audiences have noses for a stinker, King Kong Lives lacked an effective advertising campaign that sold its premise (Kong finds a mate), and the movie was sold as if it was just another B-movie retread. Which it was, but on an A budget."

Overseas, the film was a success in the Soviet Union, where it sold  tickets in 1988, becoming the top-grossing foreign film of the year and one of the top 15 highest-grossing foreign films of all time.

The film sold a total of 54,831,200 tickets worldwide, including 1,231,200 tickets in North America. The film grossed an estimated total revenue of approximately  worldwide.

The financial failure of the movie (while it earned 3.7x it's budget, it ultimately lost money due to its marketing costs) - along with movies such as Tai-Pan - led to the bankruptcy of De Laurentiis' company.

Critical response
King Kong Lives was panned by critics. Rotten Tomatoes reports a 0% approval rating based on 12 reviews, with an average rating of 2.2/10. On Metacritic, the film has a weighted average score of 32 out of 100 based on 9 critic reviews, indicating "generally unfavorable reviews".

Roger Ebert gave the film only one out of four stars and stated, "The problem with everyone in King Kong Lives is that they're in a boring movie, and they know they're in a boring movie, and they just can't stir themselves to make an effort." DEG sent a notice to Ebert and Gene Siskel notifying the two critics that they were allowed to show snippets of the film on TV in their native Chicago, but were forbidden to show the same snippets on the national scale. Siskel remarked "Obviously, they were scared [...] If you don't believe me or Roger, believe the film company, that, think about it, couldn't find a single scene that it wanted you to see." In fact, Ebert playfully noted that the children in the audience were so bored with the film, they found playing with one of the auditorium's doors a more diverting activity.

Patrick Goldstein of the Los Angeles Times opined that "this sequel, directed by John Guillermin (who was also at the helm of the 1976 version) is in good hands as long as Kong is on screen. (Designer Carlo Rambaldi has done a masterful job of sculpting his mighty ape’s features, giving him heft, surprising agility and, perhaps to age him a bit, a receding hairline.) But the film makers haven’t been able to improve on the original story. It’s still Kong vs. Civilization, with a lot of high-firepower action and wackily implausible plot twists thrown in to keep the Big Guy busy." Rambaldi's work was also lauded by Janet Maslin of The New York Times, but she nonetheless remarked that "King Kong Lives, which was directed by John Guillerman, has a dull cast and a plot that's even duller." Staff members of Variety remarked that "in portraying an Indiana Jones-type figure, [Brian] Kerwin strains for plausibility and [the] film swiftly begins to lose some early credibility."

The film was nominated for one Razzie Award, Worst Visual Effects. Actor Peter Goetz received a residual check of 12 cents from the film and decided to frame it as a tribute, never cashing it.

The film is listed in Golden Raspberry Award founder John Wilson's book The Official Razzie Movie Guide as one of The 100 Most Enjoyably Bad Movies Ever Made.

Filmink called the movie "awful. There’s no sense of adventure or danger: the bulk of the film takes place in the USA, and the rampage of Kong is played for laughs (being whacked on the head by a golf ball, etc). The leads, Linda Hamilton and Brian Kerwin, could have been cut out of the film entirely. Who wants to see a King Kong movie where the apes are in love with each other and not a human?"

Other media

Video games
Two official video games based on the film were developed and released only in Japan by Konami. They were titled King Kong 2: Ikari no Megaton Punch for the Famicom, and King Kong 2: Yomigaeru Densetsu for the MSX. The Famicom game totally discarded the human aspect of the story and players played as King Kong who has to travel around the globe fighting giant robots and certain military forces in order to save the female Kong. The game was designed as an action-adventure game with some science fiction concepts. The MSX version, on the other hand, plays from the perspective of Mitchell. This version is a role-playing game.

Notes

References

External links

1986 films
1980s fantasy adventure films
1986 independent films
1980s monster movies
American fantasy adventure films
American independent films
American monster movies
De Laurentiis Entertainment Group films
1980s English-language films
Films directed by John Guillermin
Films produced by Martha De Laurentiis
Films scored by John Scott (composer)
Films set in Borneo
Films shot in North Carolina
Films shot in Tennessee
King Kong (franchise) films
American pregnancy films
Films with screenplays by Steven Pressfield
American sequel films
Films with screenplays by Ronald Shusett
1980s American films
1980s Japanese films